Nicole Green (born October 28, 1971) was a professional sprinter sponsored by Nike and Powerade. She won the gold medal in the 4x400m relay at the 1995 World Championships in Athletics by virtue of running in the preliminary rounds representing the United States, and she also won the silver medal in the 4x400m at the 1995 Summer Universiade.

In 1995, Green was once hospitalized alongside sprinter Quincy Watts for suspected dehydration at a track meet. Green would recover and go on to set the American record in the 4x100m at the 1998 Penn Relays.

Major international competitions

References 

Living people
1971 births
American female sprinters
Universiade silver medalists for the United States
Universiade medalists in athletics (track and field)
World Athletics Championships winners
Medalists at the 1995 Summer Universiade
20th-century American women